Eduard Georg Seler (December 5, 1849 – November 23, 1922) was a prominent German anthropologist, ethnohistorian, linguist, epigrapher, academic and Americanist scholar, who made extensive contributions in these fields towards the study of pre-Columbian era cultures in the Americas.

Research
Seler is best known for his foundational studies concerning the ethnography, documents, and history of Mesoamerican cultures, for which he is regarded as one of the most influential scholars active around the turn of the 20th century. Seler laid many fundamentals in understanding and deciphering the Aztec pictorial script. A main contribution was the re-discovery and analysis of the basic Aztec calendar system: the existence of two Aztec calendars, a 365-day solar profane (everyday use) and a 260-day religious calendar. He also noted from the sources that the ceremonial killing victim figures alleged by Spanish priests and military (repeatedly reported as being greater than 10,000 or even 100,000) were most probably vastly exaggerated propaganda. This was supported by excavations in the late 20th century.

Being poor and of ailing health, he was helped and supported for decades by his wife Cäcilie (Cecilia) Seler-Sachs (1855–1935), physically and intellectually. Her photos of Aztec temples and pyramids are still useful to scientists, and after her husband's death she went about verifying his works and publishing them. Seler was also helped by Mexican scholar and historian Antonio Peñafiel.

Timeline
1863-69 — Attendance at Joachimsthalsche Gymnasium, Berlin
1870-71 — Military service (during the Franco-Prussian War)
1871-75 — Studied at University of Berlin
1875-79 — Teaching science and mathematics
1887 — Doctoral degree from University of Leipzig
1895-97 — Investigation of Maya cave sites including Quen Santo
1904-22 — Directorship of American Division, Königliches Museum für Völkerkunde in Berlin

Writings by Eduard Seler
Gesammelte Abhandlungen zur Amerikanischen Sprach- und Alterthumskunde. 5 vols. Berlin : A. Asher, 1902-1923.
Collected Works in Mesoamerican Linguistics and Archaeology. Culver City (CA) : Labyrinthos, 1990-1998; translated (by Charles P. Bowditch & Frank E. Comparato) into English.

Notes

References

External links
 Werke Eduard Selers at altamerikanistik.de
biography of Eduard Seler
 Fundación Eduard Seler, non-profit association established 1992 in Mexico City, named after Seler and devoted to the archaeology, ethnohistory and indigenous concerns of the region studied by Seler 
Over a hundred images of Uxmal in Seler's 1917 "Ruinen von Uxmal". http://academic.reed.edu/uxmal/galleries/thumbnails/drawings/Drawings-Seler.htm

1849 births
1922 deaths
People from Krosno Odrzańskie
Pre-Columbian scholars
German Mesoamericanists
German ethnologists
German anthropologists
Epigraphers
People from the Province of Brandenburg
Joachimsthalsches Gymnasium alumni